Aragats Basketball Team, is a professional basketball team based in Yerevan, Armenia. It currently plays in the Armenia Basketball League A.

History
Aragats was founded in 2018 for playing the Armenia Basketball League A. In its first season, the club won the league.

Season by season

References

External links 
Official Facebook account

Basketball teams in Armenia
Basketball teams established in 2018
2018 establishments in Armenia